Lenticular clouds (Latin: Lenticularis lentil-shaped, from lenticula lentil) are stationary clouds that form mostly in the troposphere, typically in parallel alignment to the wind direction. They are often comparable in appearance to a lens or saucer.  Nacreous clouds that form in the lower stratosphere sometimes have lenticular shapes.

There are three main types of lenticular clouds: altocumulus standing lenticular (ACSL), stratocumulus standing lenticular (SCSL), and cirrocumulus standing lenticular (CCSL), varying in altitude above the ground. Because of their unique appearance, they have been suggested as an explanation for some unidentified flying object (UFO) sightings.

Formation and appearance

As air travels along the surface of the Earth, obstructions are often encountered, including natural features, such as mountains or hills, and artificial structures, such as buildings and other constructions, which disrupt the flow of air into "eddies", or areas of turbulence.

When moist, stable air flows over a larger eddy, such as those caused by mountains, a series of large-scale standing waves form on the leeward side of the mountain. If the temperature at the crest of the wave drops below the dew point, moisture in the air may condense to form lenticular clouds. Under certain conditions, long strings of lenticular clouds may form near the crest of each successive wave, creating a formation known as a "wave cloud". Those wave systems can produce large updrafts, occasionally enough for water vapour to condense and produce precipitation.

Lenticular clouds have been said to be mistaken for UFOs, because many of them have the shape of a "flying saucer", with a characteristic "lens" or smooth, saucer-like shape. Lenticular clouds generally do not form over low-lying or flat terrain, so many people may have never seen one before and don't know that they can exist. Bright colours (called iridescence) are sometimes seen along the edge of lenticular clouds.

Flight
Pilots of powered aircraft tend to avoid flying near lenticular clouds because of the turbulence and sinking air of the rotor generated at the trailing edge of these clouds, but glider pilots actively seek them out in order to climb in the upward moving air at the leading edge. The precise location of the rising air mass is fairly easy to predict from the orientation of the clouds. "Wave lift" of this kind is often very smooth and strong, and enables gliders to soar to remarkable altitudes and to cover great distances. , the gliding world records for both distance (over 3,000 km; 1,864 mi) and absolute altitude ( (over 22,000 metres; 74,334 ft) were set using such lift.

See also
Cloud Appreciation Society
Pileus (meteorology), or cap cloud

Notes

References

External links
Standing Lenticular Clouds

 Time Lapse of Lenticulars courtesy The Weather Nutz

BBC image gallery of lenticular clouds over Yorkshire in 2011
Lenticular cloud seen from Palm Desert, California, in April 2008
kcocco.com Altocumulus Lenticular Clouds, Wasatch Mountains, Utah

San Francisco's Richmond District 2007: "Lennies" attacking the Richmond

Cumulus
Articles containing video clips